Tuda of Lindisfarne (died 664), also known as Saint Tuda, was appointed to succeed Colman as Bishop of Lindisfarne. He served for less than a year.  Although raised in Ireland, he was a staunch supporter of Roman practices, being tonsured in the Roman manner and celebrating Easter according to the Roman Computus. However, he was consecrated as bishop in Ireland.

Life
Upon Colman's departure from Lindisfarne, he requested the king to appoint Abbot Eata of Melrose Abbey as his successor as Abbot of Lindisfarne. Tuda was appointed bishop of the Northumbrians. Tuda had been educated in the south of Ireland.

Tuda became bishop in 664 and died in that same year. The Anglo-Saxon Chronicle (in its entry for 656) includes a 664 charter for the minster of Medhamsted, or Peter-borough, which lists Tuda as among the consecrators.

The same Chronicle for the year 664 records that Tuda was one of many who died in the plague of that year.

Tuda's feast day is 21 October.

Citations

References
 Catholic Online Saints and Angels St. Tuda accessed on 28 August 2007

External links
 

664 deaths
Northumbrian saints
Bishops of Lindisfarne
7th-century English bishops
7th-century deaths from plague (disease)
Irish Christian monks
7th-century Christian saints
7th-century Irish bishops
Medieval Irish saints
Irish expatriates in England
Year of birth unknown
7th-century Christian monks